Notion Press is an Indian self-publishing company based in Chennai, India. It was founded in 2012, and in 2016 it claimed to have provided services to 2000 self-published authors. In 2018, they introduced a rapid publication service, which does not include editing.

History

Notion Press was founded jointly by Naveen Valasakumar, Jana Pillay, and Bhargava Adepally in January 2012.  In 2016, it received a funding of USD 1 million from HNIs.

Services
Authors can use online tools on the Notion Press website to design their books, and they can also pay for a range of services such as basic copyediting and marketing. The company's stated goal is to help self-published authors make money of their books; according to the company, the author is allowed to keep 70% of the profit of their sales.

References

External links 
 

Self-publishing companies
Book publishing companies of India
Publishing companies of India